Blue Earth may refer to a location in the United States:

Blue Earth, Minnesota
Blue Earth City Township, Minnesota
Blue Earth County, Minnesota
The Blue Earth River in Minnesota

Other uses 
Blue Earth (album), an album by The Jayhawks
The Samsung S7550 "Blue Earth" mobile phone